This page gathers the results of elections in Aosta Valley.

Regional elections

Latest regional election

List of previous regional elections
1949 Valdostan regional election
1954 Valdostan regional election
1959 Valdostan regional election
1963 Valdostan regional election
1968 Valdostan regional election
1973 Valdostan regional election
1978 Valdostan regional election
1983 Valdostan regional election
1988 Valdostan regional election
1993 Valdostan regional election
1998 Valdostan regional election
2003 Valdostan regional election
2008 Valdostan regional election
2013 Valdostan regional election
2018 Valdostan regional election

Italian general elections in Aosta Valley

Latest general election

List of previous general elections
1946 Italian general election in Aosta Valley
1948 Italian general election in Aosta Valley
1953 Italian general election in Aosta Valley
1958 Italian general election in Aosta Valley
1963 Italian general election in Aosta Valley
1968 Italian general election in Aosta Valley
1972 Italian general election in Aosta Valley
1976 Italian general election in Aosta Valley
1979 Italian general election in Aosta Valley
1983 Italian general election in Aosta Valley
1987 Italian general election in Aosta Valley
1992 Italian general election in Aosta Valley
1994 Italian general election in Aosta Valley
1996 Italian general election in Aosta Valley
2001 Italian general election in Aosta Valley
2006 Italian general election in Aosta Valley
2008 Italian general election in Aosta Valley
2013 Italian general election in Aosta Valley
2018 Italian general election in Aosta Valley

European Parliament elections in Aosta Valley

Latest European Parliament election

List of previous European Parliament elections
1979 European Parliament election in Aosta Valley
1984 European Parliament election in Aosta Valley
1989 European Parliament election in Aosta Valley
1994 European Parliament election in Aosta Valley
1999 European Parliament election in Aosta Valley
2004 European Parliament election in Aosta Valley
2009 European Parliament election in Aosta Valley
2014 European Parliament election in Aosta Valley

Notes

References